is the most recent anime TV series based on Fujiko F. Fujio's manga of the same name. Produced by Shin-Ei Animation and Asatsu-DK, it began airing on TV Asahi on April 15, 2005. It also airs in over 50 countries worldwide.

This Doraemon anime series is sometimes referred to in Asia as the Mizuta Edition (水田版), after Wasabi Mizuta, the voice actress who voices Doraemon in this series.

The anime is licensed by Viz Media for broadcast rights only. An English dub produced by Bang Zoom! Entertainment aired on Disney XD in the USA as Doraemon: Gadget Cat From the Future from July 7, 2014 until May 12, 2017. A second season of the English dub premiered on Disney XD on June 15, 2015 and ended on September 1 of the same year.

TV Asahi currently holds distribution and licensing rights to Doraemon. However, they mentioned that due to the show's success in India, they would be continuing their contract with Disney Channel India for Doraemon to air in India. Doraemon is also streaming on Disney+ Hotstar. They also noted the show's success in Spain, Portugal, and the rest of Europe.

Production

Although the series is more faithful to the original manga, some changes were made. Many of the episodes that adapted chapters from the manga were extended to have a better conclusion or a good moral to the story. In addition, some elements from the manga were toned down. Some examples include all of Doraemon's gadgets that resembled medicine being changed to different appliances, and Nobita's dad (who smoked often in the manga) rarely smoked.

The voice actors to the five main characters, Doraemon, Nobita, Shizuka, Gian, and Suneo, were chosen from a pool of 590 applicants. TV Asahi stated in 2005 that they chose voice actors who sounded similar to the voice actors of the predecessor, so that there would not be a significant change from the original cast to the new cast.

All mini corners, partners, and next episodes previews in all episodes are cut to fit for the 30-minute block in international versions, except for Hong Kong, which are cut to fit for the 15-minute block in its time-slot. Since May 1, 2009, the series airs in high definition. In July 2017, the show got overhauled visually to use more vivid colors, which includes the use of poster artwork. As of 2019, the show now airs on Saturday nights alongside a new theme song.

US English dub
A US English dub of the 2005 series produced by Fujiko F. Fujio Pro, TV Asahi, Bang Zoom! Entertainment, and distributed by Viz Media began airing on Disney XD on July 7, 2014 under the name Doraemon: Gadget Cat from the Future. In Australia, it started airing on 26 January 2015 on Network Ten. Later it moved in Australia to Cartoon Network and Boomerang. In Canada, it briefly aired on Disney XD's Canadian feed before being re-branded as Family CHRGD. The dub features veteran anime voice actress Mona Marshall in the title role of Doraemon and Johnny Yong Bosch as Nobita (known in the dub as "Noby").

The English dub has been heavily modified to meet American broadcasting guidelines, censoring content deemed inappropriate for American children, as well as replacing many Japanese cultural elements with American cultural elements. Some modifications include Americanized character and gadget name changes from the English version of the manga, an episode order completely different from the Japanese episode order, nudity being heavily censored by adding steam, cloud effects, or clothing, and some episodes having several minutes of footage cut. However, certain uniquely Japanese characteristics - such as house structure, kneeling on the floor to eat, the side where cars drive, and Nobisuke Nobi (Toby Nobi)'s kimono - remain. Japanese food featured throughout the series were also localized: while Doraemon's favorite food, dorayaki, was kept in but referred as "yummy buns", others were edited out and replaced with Western equivalents, such as omurice becoming pancakes. All the background music and sound effects were replaced with new background music and sound effects deemed "easier for American children to emphasize with".

At least one character's personality was also partially rewritten. Shizuka (renamed Sue in the English dub) is portrayed as more tomboyish and athletic than the Japanese version, although her sweet nature and kind personality were not changed. This is reportedly because her traditionally Japanese habits were perceived as being difficult for American children to understand in test viewings of the Japanese version.

It was announced that the American version would be re-imported to Japan and aired on Disney Channel Japan starting on February 1, 2016. The network also provides an alternative re-recorded Japanese dub of the version as a secondary audio feed.

UK English dub
The series began broadcast in the United Kingdom on August 17, 2015 on Boomerang.

Plot and characters

Doraemon is a cat-like robot from the future who appears in the present to steer Nobita Nobi, an unintelligent, naive and clumsy boy, on the right path in order to secure his future. Nobita's best friend and love interest is Shizuka Minamoto. His frenemies are Takeshi Goda and Suneo Honekawa.

Episodes

Cast and crew

These include three dubs. So far, there are two notable English dubs: Bang Zoom's American English dub and Red Angel Media's British English dub, which aired on Boomerang. However, the British English dub did not receive any proper distribution.

Japanese cast
Wasabi Mizuta - Doraemon
Megumi Ōhara - Nobita Nobi
Yumi Kakazu - Shizuka Minamoto 
Subaru Kimura - Takeshi "Gian" Goda
Tomokazu Seki - Suneo Honekawa
Chiaki Fujimoto - Dorami
Mari Maruta - Mii-chan
Kotono Mitsuishi - Tamako Nobi
Yasunori Matsumoto - Nobisuke Nobi
Shihoko Hagino - Hidetoshi Dekisugi
Wataru Takagi - Sensei
Sachi Matsumoto - Sewashi Nobi
Ai Orikasa - Mrs. Minamoto 
Mahito Oba - Mr. Minamoto
Aruno Tahara - Mr. Minamoto
Minami Takayama - Mrs. Honekawa 
Hideyuki Tanaka - Mr. Honekawa
Miyako Takeuchi - Mrs. Goda
Vanilla Yamazaki - Jaiko Goda
Tomato Akai - Mini-Doras
Rie Kugimiya - Lulli (ep 228)
Yukari Tamura - Lapis Espinela
Koki Miyata - Goro

English cast

US English cast (2014-2015)
Mona Marshall - Doraemon
Johnny Yong Bosch - Noby Nobi (Nobita)
Cassandra Lee Morris - Sue Minamoto (Shizuka)
Kaiji Tang - Takeshi "Big G" Goda (Gian)
Brian Beacock - Sneech (Suneo)
Cristina Valenzuela - Mini-Doraemon
Mari Devon - Tammy Nobi (Tamako)
Tony Oliver - Toby Nobi 
John DeMita - Mr. Simmons
Dorothy Elias-Fahn - Sneech's Mom
Jessica Gee-George - Mrs. Goda
Anthony Hansen - Pork Chop (Muku)
Max Mittelman - Soby Nobi (Sewashi)
Minae Noji - Jaiko "Little G" Goda
Keith Silverstein - Mr. S
Spike Spencer - Ace Goody (Dekisugi)
Wendee Lee - Sue's Mom, Lady of the Lake
Joe J. Thomas - Mr. Saucer, Sneech's Dad
Kirk Thornton - Mr. Goda
Dave Wallace - George
Derek Stephen Prince - Stan, Additional voices

Crew
Wendee Lee - Additional Voice Director
Kristi Reed - Voice Director

UK English cast (2015-2016)
 Sarah Hauser - Doraemon
Muriel Hofmann - Noby (Nobita), Little G (Jaiko Goda)
Catherine Fu - Sue (Shizuka), Tammy Nobi (Tamako)
Dave Bridges - Takeshi "Big G" (Gian AKA Takeshi Goda)
Ben Margalith - Sneech (Suneo)

Crew
Carina Reeves - Additional Voice Director
Russell Wait - Voice Director

Hindi cast (2005-present)
Sonal Kaushal (2005–2018) / Samriddhi Shukla (2018–present) / Megha Erande Joshi (2021-present) - Doraemon
Aakash Ahuja (2005-2006) / Ojaswini Gul (2007-2008) / Simaran Kaur (2009-2017) / Akanksha Sharma (2018–2020) / Bhakti Jhaveri (2021-present) - Nobita Nobi
Parul Bhatnagar (2005–present)- Shizuka Minamoto and Mrs. Honekawa
Wajahat Hasan (2005–2020) / Sanchit Wartak (2021-present) - Suneo Honekawa
Deepansh Kakkar (2005–2019) / Aniket Khadye (2021-present) - Gian Goda
Pallavi Bharti (2005–2020) - Hidetoshi Dekisugi, Tamako Nobi, Dorami, Mrs. Goda, Shevashi, Jaiko Goda
Arannya Kaur (2021-present)- Tamako Nobi
Saleem Khan (2005–2020) - Teacher, Nobisuke Nobi and Mr. Kaminari.
Asmita Dabhole (2021-present) - Hidetoshi Dekisugi
Ghanshyam N. Shukla (2021-present) - Nobisuke Nobi, Teacher

Indonesian Cast (2009-present)
Nurhasanah / Dana Robbyansyah as Doraemon
Dewi Sartika as Nobita Nobi
Jessy Milianty as Shizuka Minamoto
Bima Sakti as Takeshi "Gian" Goda
Santosa Amin as Suneo Honekawa

Turkish Cast (2014-present)
Nuray Avcı / Berrak Kuş as Doraemon
Elif Koç as Nobita Nobi
Başak Arslan as Shizuka Minamoto
İhlam Erdoğan as Takeshi "Gian" Goda
Selay Taşdöğen as Suneo Honekawa

Music

Opening themes
The series features new opening themes, except for the first one. Most of the international versions of the series only use the third opening theme and their own endings.

The American dub uses its own unique opening sequence that compiles footage from the Japanese version. To explain the premise of the story, a narration by Doraemon about "why he came from the future" is utilized rather than an actual opening theme. The ending theme is an instrumental played over scenes from the third Japanese opening theme.

Ending themes
Since the series incorporates all the credits into the opening theme, an ending theme is primarily absent. However, some episodes use an ending theme.

DVDs released in Japan

References

External links
Official Spain website

Official Japanese Website

Doraemon (anime)
2005 anime television series debuts
Animated television series about cats
Japanese children's animated comedy television series
Japanese adult animated comedy television series
Japanese-language television shows
Shin-Ei Animation
TV Asahi original programming
Viz Media anime